Bernabe may refer to:

Persons
 Bernabe (given name)
 Bernabe (surname)

Places
 San Bernabe AVA, California wine region in Monterey County

See also  
 Barnabas
 Barnabe (disambiguation)
 Barnaby
 Barnabé
 Barney (disambiguation)
 Bernabé (disambiguation)
 Bernabei